This is the list of ice hockey teams operating (or was operated) in Estonia. The list is incomplete.

Unsorted
 ATP Kohtla-Järve
 Central Kohtla-Järve (HK Central Kohtla-Järve)
 Dünamo Tallinn (HC Dünamo Tallinn)
 Estonian Juniors
 Dünamo Tartu (HC Dünamo Tartu)
 Jõgeva HK (HK Jõgeva)
 Karud HK (HK Karud)
 Karud-Monstera Tallinn (HK Karud-Monstera Tallinn, JSK Monstera Tallinn, Monstera Tallinn, SK Monstera)
 Kohtla-Järve Central
 Kohtla-Järve ChC
 Kohtla-Järve HK Keemik (Keemik Kohtla-Järve)
 Narva LNSK (LNSK Narva)
 Ordo Narva (SK Ordo Narva) (ice sledge hockey club)
 Sillamäe Kalev (HC Sillamäe Kalev)
 Sokol Tallinn (HC Sokol Tallinn)
 Talleks Tallinn (Tallinn Talleks)
 Tallinn Ekskavaator
 Tallinn LTM
 Tallinn Sport
 Tallinn Taksopark
 Tallinn Tempo
 Tallinna Eagles (HC Eagles Tallinn)
 Tallinna Hokitsenter
 Tallinna Jeti (HC Tallinna Jeti)
 Tallinna JSK
 Tallinna Viiking Sport (HC Tallinna Viiking Sport)
 Tartu ASK
 Tartu Hokiklubi (Hokiklubi Tartu, HK Tartu)
 Tartu Linnameeskond (Linnameeskond Tartu)
 THK-88 Tallinn
 Vipers Tallinn (HK Vipers Tallinn, HK Vipers)
 Visa-Tiigrid Tallinn (HC Visa-Tiigrid Tallinn)
 YSK Tallinn

References 

 
Estonia teams
Ice hockey
Lists of organizations based in Estonia